"Dr. Mabuse" is the debut single by German new wave/synth-pop band Propaganda. The song was produced by Trevor Horn and was released on his label, ZTT in 1984. It appears on the debut album A Secret Wish. It was a moderate chart hit in the UK and Switzerland, peaking at numbers 27 and 14, respectively. In Germany, the song reached the top 10, peaking at No. 7.

The song is a reference to the character in the three Fritz Lang films; Dr. Mabuse the Gambler, The Testament of Dr. Mabuse and The Thousand Eyes of Dr. Mabuse.

A music video was produced, featuring Polish actor Vladek Sheybal as the titular character.

The 12" version features a cover of The Velvet Underground's "Femme Fatale" as its B-side. The cover was also released on the 1985 various artists compilation album I Q 6 Zang Tumb Tuum Sampled and on the 2002 compilation Outside World.

An instrumental remix of this song called "Abuse" appeared in the opening credits of the John Hughes 1987 film Some Kind of Wonderful, in which Mary Stuart Masterson's character, Watts, drums along to the dominant percussion. This version does not appear on the film's official soundtrack, however.

Towards the end of the song, just before the climax, some gibberish appears. It is actually the German question "Warum schmerzt es, wenn mein Herz den Schlag verpasst?" played backwards. The English translation is "Why does it hurt when my heart misses the beat?", the first lyrics of the song.

Chart performance

References

External links 
 Propaganda - Abuse (Dr. Mabuse remix) on YouTube

1984 songs
1984 debut singles
Propaganda (band) songs
Song recordings produced by Trevor Horn
Music videos directed by Anton Corbijn
ZTT Records singles
Island Records singles